Lieutenant-Commander Stephen Lynch Conway Maydon  (15 December 1913 – 2 March 1971) was a British Navy officer and politician who had a brief career in government.

Maydon's father John, after whom Maydon Wharf in Durban is named, was a member of the Natal Legislative Assembly and he was born there (in Pietermaritzburg). He however moved to Britain at the age of 4 after the death of his father and was brought up in Britain and schooled at Twyford School near Winchester. He showed an early interest in the Royal Navy, enlisting in 1931, and studied at the Royal Naval College in Dartmouth. 

Commanding Tradewind, he torpedoed 14 Japanese vessels, none of which were warships. Maydon was married to Joan (née Baker) until his death.

At the 1950 general election, Maydon fought Bristol South, a safe Labour constituency. He was then chosen for the safe Conservative seat of Wells, which he won in the 1951 election. Peter Thorneycroft, then President of the Board of Trade, named him as his Parliamentary Private Secretary in 1952; he served for only a year.

After the 1959 general election, Maydon was Chairman of the Conservative Parliamentary Party Defence Committee for two years. Harold Macmillan brought him into government as Joint Parliamentary Secretary to the Ministry of Pensions and National Insurance from July 1962, where he served alongside Margaret Thatcher. He retained this office under Sir Alec Douglas-Home.

Maydon was a right-winger who supported the use of corporal punishment, arguing that it was an effective sentence as a last resort. He opposed sanctions against Rhodesia and voted against the Race Relations Act 1968 (which made it illegal to refuse housing, employment, or public services to a person on the grounds of colour, race, ethnic or national origins) and also opposed House of Lords Reform. In 1968 he declared to the House of Commons that he was '[...] one of the few—I believe perhaps the only—Member of this House who supports and believes in apartheid.' He retired at the 1970 general election, and died less than a year later.

References

Sources
M. Stenton and S. Lees, "Who's Who of British MPs" Vol. IV (Harvester Press, 1981)
Philip Norton, "Dissension in the House of Commons 1945-1974" (Macmillan, 1975)

External links 
 

1913 births
1971 deaths
Royal Navy submarine commanders
Royal Navy officers of World War II
Recipients of the Distinguished Service Cross (United Kingdom)
Conservative Party (UK) MPs for English constituencies
UK MPs 1951–1955
UK MPs 1955–1959
UK MPs 1959–1964
UK MPs 1964–1966
UK MPs 1966–1970
Companions of the Distinguished Service Order
People educated at Twyford School
Ministers in the Macmillan and Douglas-Home governments, 1957–1964